The Suriname Athletics Federation (SAB; Surinaamse Atletiek Bond) is the governing body for the sport of athletics in Suriname.  Current president is Dennis Mac Donald.

History 

SAB was founded on December 30, 1948.

Affiliations 
SAB is the national member federation for Suriname in the following international organisations:
International Association of Athletics Federations (IAAF)
Confederación Sudamericana de Atletismo (CONSUDATLE; South American Athletics Confederation)
Association of Panamerican Athletics (APA)
Central American and Caribbean Athletic Confederation (CACAC)
Moreover, it is part of the following national organisations:
Suriname Olympic Committee (Dutch: Surinaams Olympisch Comité)

National records 
SAB maintains the Surinamese records in athletics.

References

External links 
  

Suriname
Athletics Federation
National governing bodies for athletics
Sports organizations established in 1948